The Tioga Kid is a 1948 American Western film directed by Ray Taylor and written by Ed Earl Repp. The film stars Eddie Dean, Roscoe Ates, Jennifer Holt, Dennis Moore, Lee Bennett and William Fawcett. The film was released on June 17, 1948, by Eagle-Lion Films.

Plot

Cast          
Eddie Dean as Eddie Dean / The Tioga Kid
Roscoe Ates as Soapy Jones
Jennifer Holt as Jenny Morgan
Dennis Moore as Joe Morino
Lee Bennett as Tucson
William Fawcett as Tennessee 
Eddie Parker as Clem
Bob Woodward as Trigger
Wylie Grant as Sam 
Terry Frost as Ranger Captain
Andy Parker as Ranger Andy
Flash as Eddie's Horse

References

External links
 

1948 films
American Western (genre) films
1948 Western (genre) films
Producers Releasing Corporation films
Eagle-Lion Films films
Films directed by Ray Taylor
American black-and-white films
1940s English-language films
1940s American films